Machacado con huevo, Machaca con huevo, or Huevos con machaca is a dish consisting of shredded dry beef that is scrambled with eggs.  Its name means "shredded with eggs" in Spanish.  The shredded dry beef, carne seca or "machaca", is said to have originated in the town of Ciénega de Flores, about an hour's drive north of Monterrey, Mexico. The early settlers in the area air-cured beef so that it would be preserved.

The basic machacado con huevo is made with eggs and dried beef. Chopped tomatoes, onions and jalapeños or serrano chili peppers can be added, or salsa can be cooked into it, to create another version. This is a traditional dish in the northern Mexican state of Nuevo León that is usually eaten at breakfast, but was also eaten at other meals. In the US, this breakfast or brunch dish is popular in Texas.

History
According to one legend, the dish was invented in the 1920s by Fidencia Quiroga, who was known locally as "Tía Lencha" (Aunt Lencha).  Although there is minimal evidence that the dish originated with her, there is litte doubt that she popularized it when she began to serve it in her restaurant to construction workers building the nearby Monterrey-Nuevo Laredo highway in 1928. As a result of her association with machacado con huevo, a major manufacturer of the shredded dried beef that is used in it—Productos Alimenticios Tia Lencha SA—is named after her.

See also

 List of beef dishes
 List of egg dishes

References

Mexican beef dishes
Egg dishes
Mexican cuisine